Kathleen Delaney is an American stage, voice actress, dancer and playwright who works on Broadway and on the properties of 4Kids Entertainment. She is best known as the voice of Hina in the 4Kids dub of One Piece, Mai Valentine in uncut versions of Yu-Gi-Oh! and Rouge in Sonic X and the succeeding games until 2010, when she was replaced by Karen Strassman.

Voice roles
 Magical DoReMi – Patunia
 One Piece – Alvida, Hina (4Kids dub)
 Sonic the Hedgehog series – Rouge the Bat (US/EUR/NA)
 Ultimate Muscle – Jacqueline McMadd
 Viva Piñata – Tina Twingersnap
 Yu-Gi-Oh! – Mai Valentine (uncut DVDs)
 Yu-Gi-Oh! GX – Tania

Theatrical roles

Acting credits
Gypsy – Mazeppa
Hamlet – Gertrude
The Best Little Whorehouse in Texas – Ginger
Alice in Wonderland – Queen of Hearts
The Seagull – Arkadina

References

External links

Living people
American female dancers
American stage actresses
American video game actresses
American voice actresses
American women dramatists and playwrights
21st-century American actresses
21st-century American dancers
21st-century American singers
21st-century American women singers
Year of birth missing (living people)